The 2016 ICC Africa Twenty20 Division Two was an international 20-over cricket tournament held in Benoni, South Africa, from 16 to 19 April 2016. All matches were played at the Willowmoore Park complex. Sierra Leone were undefeated in their four matches, qualifying for Division One.

Teams
Three teams competed in the tournament:

  (6th in 2014 ICC Africa Twenty20 Division Two)
  (2nd in 2014 ICC Africa Twenty20 Division Three)
  (3rd in 2014 ICC Africa Twenty20 Division Three)

Swaziland, which placed fifth at the 2014 Division Two tournament, were disqualified from the event for fielding ineligible players in a previous competition.

Points table 
Source: CricHQ

Win – 2 points
Loss – 0 points
Tie or no result – 1 point

Fixtures

See also
 ICC Africa Twenty20 Championship

References 

International cricket competitions in 2015–16
2016 in South African cricket
International cricket competitions in South Africa